The Milwaukee Cup is a traveling trophy awarded to the winner of the annual men's soccer (association football) match between Marquette University and the University of Wisconsin–Milwaukee. 

Milwaukee leads the all-time series, 31–12–5, however, Marquette currently holds the cup after a 5-2 victory over Milwaukee at Valley Fields on September 20, 2022.

In the event of a draw, the cup remains in the possession of the school holding it prior to the match.

Cup matches since 2006 have taken on a heightened sense of rivalry due to Louis Bennett's acceptance of the head coaching position at Marquette.  Bennett took the job after 10 successful seasons as the head coach at Milwaukee.

The September 13, 2006, match took on extra importance for Milwaukee as it was the first played under lights at Engelmann Field.  The undertaking to have lights installed was largely initiated and supported by Bennett and his staff while they coached at UWM.  Milwaukee won, 3–2.

The cup match stands as one of the few examples of a true derby in American soccer.

Match Results

References

Sports in Milwaukee
College soccer rivalries in the United States
College soccer rivalry trophies in the United States
1973 establishments in Wisconsin
Recurring sporting events established in 1973
Marquette Golden Eagles men's soccer
Milwaukee Panthers men's soccer